In artificial intelligence (AI), collaborative combat aircraft (CCA) are robotic loyal wingmen such as the Boeing MQ-28 Ghost Bat, Kratos XQ-58 Valkyrie, General Dynamics X-62 VISTA, or the entrants in the Skyborg Vanguard program. The uncrewed CCAs represent a class of aircraft which are meant to collaborate with the crewed Next Generation Air Dominance (NGAD) aircraft.

Heather Penney has advocated for proactive development of autonomous loyal wingmen (that is, collaborative combat aircraft), and human pilots who are flying separately in manned aircraft (also called crewed-uncrewed teaming, or manned-unmanned teaming) or who are piloting UAVs.

In 2020, DARPA AlphaDogfight established that AI programs that fly fighter aircraft will overmatch human pilots. One possible application is to elevate the role of human pilots to mission commanders, leaving AIs as wingmen to perform as high-skill operators of low-cost robotic craft. The NGAD is anticipated to use loyal wingmen (CCAs). Air Force Secretary Frank Kendall envisions these uncrewed aircraft as performing parts of a larger mission; CCA development can be conducted in parallel with NGAD development, which has to take into account a larger set of requirements. CCAs can perform other missions as well, as "a sensor, as a shooter, as a weapons carrier, as a cost reducer". Up to five autonomous CCAs would operate with an NGAD.

Air Force Research Laboratory (AFRL) will test their Skyborg manned-unmanned programs such as Autonomous Air Combat Operations (AACO), and  DARPA will test its Air Combat Evolution (ACE) artificial intelligence program. The System for Autonomous Control of Simulation (SACS) software for human interface is being developed by Calspan.

DARPA's Longshot is an air-launched UAV meant to extend the range of a mission and reduce the risk to manned aircraft, which could then remain at standoff range; if Longshot were to use Air Combat Evolution (ACE), missiles launched from that Longshot could more effectively select targets.

On 9 December 2022 the Air Force Test Pilot School tested its General Dynamics X-62 VISTA with 2 different AI packages. By 16 December 2022 the X-62 Vista had flown eight sorties using ACE, and six sorties using AACO, at a rate of two sorties per day.

Although a CCA will be a fraction of the cost of a manned fighter, they would not be considered expendable or even attritable. Air Force Secretary Frank Kendall described them as remotely controlled versions of targeting pods, electronic warfare pods or weapons carriers to provide additional sensors and munitions. To balance affordability and capability, a CCA could cost as much as half the price of an $80 million F-35. Kendall is aiming for an initial fleet of 1,000 CCAs, two paired with 200 NGAD platforms and two for 300 F-35s, in order to work out concepts to integrate them into the service, but the full inventory could be twice that size.

Notes

References 

Robotics
Attrition warfare
Command and control